"I'll Follow the Sun" is a song by the English rock band the Beatles. It is a ballad written and sung by Paul McCartney and credited to Lennon–McCartney. It was released in 1964 on the Beatles for Sale album in the United Kingdom and on Beatles '65 in the United States. The band played the song on the BBC program Top Gear, and the track was released on On Air – Live at the BBC Volume 2 in 2013.

The song was released as a mono extended play 45 in 1964 on Parlophone/EMI (and in 1995 as a B-side to "Baby It's You"). In Sweden, it reached number one on the Tio i Topp chart in July and also peaked at number four on Sweden's Kvällstoppen Chart.

Composition
When asked about the lyrics, McCartney commented: "I wrote that in my front parlour in Forthlin Road. I was about 16. 'I'll Follow the Sun' was one of those very early ones. I seem to remember writing it just after I'd had the flu and I had that cigarette. I remember standing in the parlour, with my guitar, looking out through the lace curtains of the window, and writing that one."

Recording
McCartney explained, "The next [single] had to always be different. We didn't want to fall into the Supremes trap where they all sounded similar, so we were always keen on having varied instrumentation. Ringo couldn't keep changing his drum kit, but he could change his snare, tap a cardboard box or slap his knees."

Personnel
According to Walter Everett:

Paul McCartney lead and harmony vocals, acoustic guitar
John Lennon harmony vocal
George Harrison electric rhythm guitar, guitar solo
Ringo Starr percussion

Cover versions

In 1966, Chet Atkins released an instrumental cover on his album Chet Atkins Picks on the Beatles.
The song was covered by David Ball in 1995 for the Beatles tribute album Come Together: America Salutes the Beatles.
McCartney performed the song live during The 'US' Tour; likewise at the Paris Olympia on 22 October 2007, in Kyiv for the Independence Concert on 14 June 2008, in Quebec City at the free outdoor concert on 20 July 2008 (for the city's 400th anniversary celebration), at Tel Aviv, Israel, on 25 September 2008, and in New York City on 12 May 2015 (charity concert for the Robin Hood Benefit).
Glen Phillips (lead singer of Toad the Wet Sprocket) covered the song for the soundtrack of the 2009 Eddie Murphy film Imagine That.

Notes

References

Sources

External links

 
 

The Beatles songs
1964 songs
Song recordings produced by George Martin
Songs written by Lennon–McCartney
Songs published by Northern Songs
Number-one singles in Sweden
British folk rock songs
British country music songs